Digby—Yarmouth was a federal electoral district in the province of Nova Scotia, Canada, that was represented in the House of Commons of Canada from 1949 to 1953.

This riding was created in 1947 from parts of Digby—Annapolis—Kings and Shelburne—Yarmouth—Clare ridings.  It consisted of the counties of Digby and Yarmouth. It was abolished in 1952 when it was redistributed into Digby—Annapolis—Kings and Shelburne—Yarmouth—Clare ridings.

Its only Member of Parliament was Thomas Andrew Murray Kirk of the Liberal Party of Canada.

Members of Parliament

This riding has elected the following Member of Parliament:

Election results

See also 

 List of Canadian federal electoral districts
 Past Canadian electoral districts

External links 
 Riding history for Digby—Yarmouth (1947–1952) from the Library of Parliament

Former federal electoral districts of Nova Scotia